John "Jack" McClelland (19 May 1940 – 15 March 1976) was a Northern Irish international footballer who played as a goalkeeper. McClelland played professionally in England for Arsenal, Fulham and Lincoln City, making 109 appearances in the Football League, as well as earning six caps for the Northern Ireland national side. He died of a brain tumour in March 1976 at the age of 35.

References

External links
 
 Northern Ireland's Footballing Greats

1940 births
1976 deaths
Association footballers from Northern Ireland
Northern Ireland international footballers
Glenavon F.C. players
Arsenal F.C. players
Fulham F.C. players
Lincoln City F.C. players
Barnet F.C. players
Deaths from brain cancer in Northern Ireland
Association football goalkeepers